Anselm Jappe (born 3 May 1962, Bonn) is a German professor of philosophy.

Biography
He grew up in Cologne and in the Périgord.  He studied in Paris and Rome where he obtained, respectively, a master's and then a doctorate degree in philosophy.  His advisor was Mario Perniola.  A member of the Krisis Groupe, he has published numerous articles in different journals and reviews, including Iride (Florence), Il Manifesto (Rome), L'Indice (Milan) and Mania (Barcelona).  In his writings, he has attempted to revive critical theory through a new interpretation of the work of Karl Marx.

He is currently teaching aesthetics at the Accademia di Belle Arti di Sassari.  Since 2002/2003 he was  teaching at the Accademia di Belle Arti di Frosinone

Books
1992: Debord, Pescara: Tracce - about Guy Debord
1999: English translation by Donald Nicholson-Smith, Berkeley: University of California Press, 1999
2004: An Imbecile's Guide to Guy Debord's concept of the Spectacle, first published as "Part 1: The Concept of the Spectacle" in Guy Debord
2003: Les Habits neufs de l'empire : remarques sur Negri, Hardt et Rufin (with Robert Kurz) (Editions Lignes)
2004: L'avant-garde inacceptable - réflexions sur Guy Debord (Editions lignes-Léo Sheer)
2005: Adventures of the commodity: for a new criticism of value (Munich)
2017" The Writing on the Wall: On the Decomposition of Capitalism and Its Critics, - a collection of revised essays

References

1962 births
Writers from Bonn
Living people
German Marxists
German male writers